Badanpur is a village in Magura District of Khulna division, Bangladesh.

References

Villages in Magura District